The twenty-first season of the Case Closed anime was directed by Kōjin Ochi (until episode 666, and then 678–679) and Yasuichiro Yamamoto (since episode 667, except 678–679) and produced by TMS Entertainment and Yomiuri Telecasting Corporation. The series is based on Gosho Aoyama's Case Closed manga series. In Japan, the series is titled  but was changed due to legal issues with the title Detective Conan. The series focuses on the adventures of teenage detective Shinichi Kudo who was turned into a child by a poison called APTX 4869, but continues working as a detective under the alias Conan Edogawa.

The episodes use five pieces of theme music: two opening and three ending themes. The first opening theme is "Miss Mystery" by Breakerz up until episode 666.

The season aired between February 18, 2012, and December 15, 2012, on Nippon Television Network System in Japan. The season was later collected and released in nine DVD compilations by Shogakukan between February 22, 2013 and October 25, 2013, in Japan.


Episode list

Notes

References

2012 Japanese television seasons
Season21